John Robarts (1917–1982) was a Canadian lawyer and statesman.

John Robartsor Robartes may also refer to:

John Robarts (Baháʼí) (1901-1991), Canadian Bahá'í appointed a Hand of the Cause of God
John Robarts (VC) (1818-1888), English recipient of the Victoria Cross
John Robartes, 1st Earl of Radnor (1606–1685), English politician and soldier during the English Civil War English and English Restoration
John Robartes, 4th Earl of Radnor (1686–1757)

See also
John Roberts (disambiguation)